Out of the Wilderness is a 2001 television film directed by Steve Kroschel.

Plot
This is the story of a raven, considered by ornithologists to be the most intelligent of birds, who through its antics disrupts a family, even to causing enough problems that the town finally decides to put the bird on trial for its life. The tale is told in retrospect during that trial by the young girl who owns it.

External links 
 

2001 films
American children's films
2000s English-language films
2000s American films